Entebbe is a city in Central Uganda. Entebbe was once the seat of government for the Protectorate of Uganda prior to independence, in 1962. The city is the location of Entebbe International Airport, Uganda's largest commercial and military airport, best known for the Israeli rescue of 100 hostages kidnapped by the militant group of the PFLP-EO and Revolutionary Cells (RZ) organizations. Entebbe is also the location of State House, the official office and residence of the President of Uganda.

Etymology
The word came from Luganda language e ntebe which means 'seat' / 'chair'. Entebbe was a cultural site for the Mamba clan and it was called "entebbe za Mugula" - Mugula was the title of a chief of a subdivision of the Mamba clan - and is now the location of the official office and residence of the President of Uganda, as it was for British governors before independence. Entebbe was the former seat of power in the country, but has now been replaced by Kampala.

Location
Entebbe sits on the northern shores of Lake Victoria, Africa's largest lake. The coordinates of Entebbe are:0°03'00.0"N, 32°27'36.0"E (Latitude:0.0500; Longitude:32.4600). Neighborhoods within Entebbe City include Bugonga, Katabi, Nakiwogo, Nsamizi, Kitooro, Lunnyo and Lugonjo.

Population
During the 2002 national census, Entebbe's population was estimated at about 55,100 people. In 2010, the Uganda Bureau of Statistics (UBOS) estimated the population of the town at 76,500. In 2011, UBOS estimated the population of Entebbe at approximately 79,700. On 27 August 2014, the national population census put Entebbe's population at 69,958.

History
"Entebbe", in the local Luganda language, means a "seat" and was probably named that because it was the place where a Baganda chief sat to adjudicate legal cases. It first became a British colonial administrative and commercial centre in 1893 when Sir Gerald Portal, a colonial Commissioner, used it as a base. Port Bell went on to become Kampala's harbour. Although no ships dock there now, there is still a jetty, which was used by Lake Victoria ferries.

Entebbe International Airport, the main international airport of Uganda, has been the site of some well known events, making it famous in Europe and abroad. It was from this airport that Queen Elizabeth II departed Africa to return to England in 1952 when she learned of her father's death and that she had become Queen. The airport was the scene of Operation Entebbe, a hostage rescue on 4 July 1976, when soldiers from the Sayeret Matkal, Paratroopers Brigade and Golani Brigade units of the Israeli Army freed over 100 hostages following a hijacking by a group of Palestinian and German militia.

The city of Entebbe also hosted final resolution talks to end the M23 rebellion.

Biomedical research hub

Entebbe is home to the Uganda Virus Research Institute (UVRI), a Ugandan government organization which provides space to conduct research to the International AIDS Vaccine Initiative HIV vaccine program, the UK Medical Research Centre Laboratories (MRC), the US Centre for Disease Control (CDC) and the National Institutes of Health (NIH). Most research performed at UVRI is infectious disease-oriented and focuses on HIV, tuberculosis, malaria and helminth infections. It is also home for the headquarters of Uganda National Medical Stores, until the new headquarters and main warehouse building in Kajjansi is completed, then the headquarters will relocate to Kajjansi.

Tourist attractions
The extensive National Botanical Gardens, laid out in 1898, are located in Entebbe.
 Entebbe is the home of the Uganda Virus Research Institute (UVRI)
 Entebbe is the location of the Uganda Wildlife Education Centre (UWEC) The centre also serves as the national zoo. The entrance to the centre is located near the jetty. Foreign visitors have noted the seeming incongruity of wild monkeys sitting in the trees over the centre's paths.
 Entebbe is the location of Nkumba University, one of the more than thirty licensed institutions of tertiary education in Uganda.
 State House, the official residence of the President of Uganda, is located in Entebbe.
 Entebbe is also home to the historical site in Kigungu where the first catholic missionaries Brother Amans and Father Mon Maple Lourdel landed to establish the catholic faith in Uganda.

 Entebbe is home of the oldest golf course in East Africa called Entebbe Golf Club, which was established in 1900. Entebbe Golf Club is surrounded by the Uganda Wildlife Education Centre, (formerly Entebbe Zoo), on its south side.

Government and infrastructure
The head office of the Ugandan Civil Aviation Authority is on the property of Entebbe International Airport. The Uganda Ministry of Agriculture, Animal Industry and Fisheries maintains its headquarters in Entebbe.

The Special Forces Command, a specialized unit of the Uganda People's Defense Forces, responsible for the security of the president of Uganda, his immediate family, constitutional monarchs, state guests and vital national assets, including the national oil fields, maintains its headquarters in Entebbe.

Other points of interest
Other points of interest within the city limits or close to its edges include the offices of Entebbe City Council and several branches of foreign and indigenous commercial banks. The supermarket chain, Shoprite, maintains a branch in Entebbe. In 2014, the American fast-food chain KFC opened a franchise in the town.

Geography

Climate 
Entebbe experiences tropical rainforest climate (Af) according to the Köppen climate classification as the city has no real dry season throughout the year. The driest season is January with precipitation total , while the wettest season is April with precipitation total . The temperature is moderated by the altitude. The hottest month is February with average temperature , while the coolest month is July with average temperature .

See also

References

External links
Updated Website: A guide to Entebbe City

Profile of Entebbe Town In August 2012 
UVRI-IAVI HIV Vaccine Program in Entebbe 
MRC/UVRI Uganda Research Unit on AIDS

 
Populated places in Central Region, Uganda
Populated places on Lake Victoria
Cities in the Great Rift Valley
Wakiso District